The following events occurred in May 1926:

Saturday, May 1, 1926
800,000 British coal miners were locked out.
5 were killed and 28 injured in fighting between socialists and communists during May Day events in Warsaw, Poland.
Swinton defeated Oldham 9–3 in the Challenge Cup Final of rugby.

Sunday, May 2, 1926
Civil war broke out in Nicaragua.
Women in India are allowed to stand for election to public office.

Monday, May 3, 1926
As called for by the Trades Union Congress, an estimated 1.7 million people began a general strike in Britain in support of the locked out miners, at one minute to midnight.

Tuesday, May 4, 1926
Britain came to a standstill on the first full day of the general strike. Subways and rail stations were closed and the streets of London were devoid of street cars or buses.
The Ballets Russes staged a production of Romeo and Juliet at the Opéra de Monte-Carlo, with sets and costumes designed by Surrealist artists Max Ernst and Joan Miró.
Stinson Aircraft Corporation was incorporated.

Wednesday, May 5, 1926
Two new papers, the British Worker (supporting the general strike) and the British Gazette (condemning it) appeared in Britain to fill the void left by the other dailies that only published in very limited form during the strike.
The Norge airship left Gatchina near Leningrad, bound for Vadsø in preparation to cross the North Pole.
Born: Ann B. Davis, actress, in Schenectady, New York (d. 2014); and Bing Russell, actor, in Brattleboro, Vermont (d. 2003)

Thursday, May 6, 1926
Limited services returned around Britain as volunteers and strike-breaking workers stepped in, notably to help distribute food and provide other necessities. 
Born: Edward Clark, painter, in Storyville, New Orleans (d. 2019)

Friday, May 7, 1926
With peace talks having failed, French warplanes bombed Rif Republic positions as the Rif War resumed. 
In the Soviet Union, Léon Theremin demonstrated his experimental television system which electrically transmitted and then projected near-simultaneous moving images on a five-foot square screen as part of his thesis.

Saturday, May 8, 1926

Prime Minister Stanley Baldwin addressed the British public about the ongoing strike in an evening radio broadcast; such a broadcast in a time of emergency was the first of its kind in the country. 
Wigan defeated Warrington 22–10 to win the Northern Rugby Football League championship.
Born: 
 David Attenborough, broadcaster and naturalist, in Isleworth, London 
 Don Rickles, comedian, in Queens, New York (d. 2017)

Sunday, May 9, 1926

Explorer Richard E. Byrd and co-pilot Floyd Bennett claimed to be the first to fly over the North Pole in the Josephine Ford monoplane, taking off from Spitsbergen, Norway and returning 15 hours and 44 minutes later. Both men were immediately hailed as national heroes, though some experts have since been skeptical of the claim, believing that the plane was unlikely to have covered the entire distance and back in that short an amount of time. An entry in Byrd's diary discovered in 1996 suggested that the plane actually turned back 150 miles short of the North Pole due to an oil leak. 
Although Britain was quiet in light of the Sabbath, soldiers were becoming an increasingly common sight in the streets of London.
Died: J. M. Dent, 76, British publisher

Monday, May 10, 1926
The Flying Scotsman, the train on the route between Edinburgh and King's Cross, London, was derailed in Northumberland by a group of locked-out miners who pulled up the tracks. This caused the Government to use increasingly hostile rhetoric against the strikers, using such terms as "anarchists" and "lunatics".
Born: Tichi Wilkerson Kassel, film personality and the publisher of The Hollywood Reporter, in Los Angeles, California (d. 2004)

Tuesday, May 11, 1926
In Britain, Mr. Justice Asbury granted an injunction to the National Sailors' and Firemen's Union to enjoin the General-Secretary of its Tower Hill branch from calling its members out on strike. Astbury ruled that the strike was not protected by the Trade Disputes Act 1906 and that the strike in the plaintiff union had been called in contravention of its own rules. The ruling came as a heavy blow to the Unions' cause.
The airship Norge departed Ny-Ålesund en route to the North Pole. Roald Amundsen led the 16-man crew.

Wednesday, May 12, 1926

The Italian-built airship Norge reached the North Pole at 01:25 Greenwich time; Norwegian, American and Italian flags were dropped onto the ice. The Norge continued on toward Alaska in its bid to cross the entire Arctic Ocean.
The May Coup began in Poland. A state of emergency was declared as units loyal to Marshal Józef Piłsudski marched on Warsaw.
The Trades Union Congress called off the general strike.
Hans Luther resigned as Chancellor of Germany after losing a vote of no confidence in the Reichstag.
Planes piloted by Major Harold Geiger and Horace Meek Hickam, students at the Air Corps Tactical School, collided in mid-air at Langley Field, Virginia. Both pilots survived; Hickham joined the Caterpillar Club by parachuting to safety.

Thursday, May 13, 1926
The Polish government held negotiations with Marshal Piłsudski. No agreement was reached and fighting broke out around 19:00 hours.  
Britain started to return to normal on the first day back from the general strike, though many transport services were late in their resumption. Voluntary workers were still keeping buses and trains running. Miners remained locked out.

Friday, May 14, 1926
In Poland, President Stanisław Wojciechowski and Prime Minister Wincenty Witos resigned their positions to prevent the fighting in Warsaw from becoming a country-wide civil war. Maciej Rataj took over as acting President.
Due to worsening weather, the crew of the Norge decided to land rather than press on to their goal of Nome. The airship touched down in Teller, Alaska.
The Mary Pickford film Sparrows was released.
Born: Eric Morecambe, comedian, in Morecambe, Lancashire, England (d. 1984)

Saturday, May 15, 1926
Kazimierz Bartel took over as Prime Minister of Poland.
Bubbling Over won the 1926 Kentucky Derby.
Born: Anthony Shaffer, novelist and playwright, in Liverpool, England (d. 2001), and twin brother Peter Shaffer, playwright and screenwriter (d. 2016)

Sunday, May 16, 1926
1926 Copa del Rey Final: FC Barcelona won their seventh championship, defeating Atlético Madrid 3–2.
The hit film Aloma of the South Seas opened.
Died: Mehmed VI, 65, last Ottoman Sultan

Monday, May 17, 1926

Wilhelm Marx became Chancellor of Germany for the second time.
Born: Franz Sondheimer, British chemist, in Stuttgart, Germany (d. 1981)

Tuesday, May 18, 1926
The nationally famous Christian evangelist preacher Aimee Semple McPherson disappeared at a beach in Venice, California. She was widely believed at the time to have drowned.
Born: Dirch Passer, Danish actor (d. 1980)

Wednesday, May 19, 1926
The French Air Force bombed Damascus, trying to suppress the ongoing revolt.

Thursday, May 20, 1926
The United States Congress passed the Air Commerce Act, licensing pilots and planes.
The Railway Labor Act was also passed.
Pete Latzo won the World Welterweight Boxing Title, defeating Mickey Walker in Scranton, Pennsylvania.
Born: John Lucarotti, screenwriter, in Aldershot, England (d. 1994)

Friday, May 21, 1926
The adventure film The Barrier, starring Lionel Barrymore, was released.
Born: Robert Creeley, poet, in Arlington, Massachusetts (d. 2005)

Saturday, May 22, 1926
Belgium, France, Great Britain and Netherlands signed the Belgian Neutrality Treaty, which formally abrogated the 1839 Treaty of London.
The St. Louis Cardinals held "Rogers Hornsby" day, in which the player-manager was presented $1,000 in gold and a medal for being named the National League's Most Valuable Player for 1925. Hornsby then went 2-for-4 in a 9-2 Cardinals win over the Philadelphia Phillies.

Sunday, May 23, 1926
The first Lebanese constitution was promulgated.
An estimated 30,000 members of the Communist Party of Germany demonstrated in Berlin. About 50,000 members of Der Stahlhelm held a demonstration of their own in Düsseldorf.

Monday, May 24, 1926
The Mexican government announced the nationalization of minerals and petroleum resources, which clouded the property rights of foreign resource extraction companies and increased tensions between Mexico and the United States.
The National Libertarian Federation of Trade Unions was founded in Japan.
1926 Mount Tokachi volcano eruption, 165 people were killed in Hokkaido, Japan.

Tuesday, May 25, 1926

Ukrainian nationalist leader Symon Petliura was assassinated by the anarchist poet Sholom Schwartzbard in the center of Paris.
Parliamentary elections were held in Romania. The People's Party won 292 out of 387 contested seats.
U.S. President Coolidge signed the Public Buildings Act into law.
Born: Bill Sharman, basketball player and coach, in Abilene, Texas (d. 2013)
Died: Symon Petliura, 47, Ukrainian independence fighter

Wednesday, May 26, 1926
Riffian rebel leader Abd el-Krim surrendered to the French in Morocco, ending the Rif War.
Born: Miles Davis, jazz musician, in Alton, Illinois (d. 1991)

Thursday, May 27, 1926
The Rif Republic was disestablished.
The Thayer Hotel of the United States Military Academy at West Point officially opened.
Born: Kees Rijvers, footballer, in Breda, Netherlands (alive in 2021)

Friday, May 28, 1926

The 28 May coup d'état, commanded by Manuel Gomes da Costa, began in Braga, Portugal.

Saturday, May 29, 1926
The military coup in Braga spread to the rest of Portugal. The Ditadura Nacional (National Dictatorship) was established.
Born: Abdoulaye Wade, President of Senegal, in Kébémer (alive in 2021)

Sunday, May 30, 1926
António Maria da Silva resigned as Prime Minister of Portugal.
The drama film The Unknown Soldier opened.
Born: Tsuneo Watanabe, Japanese businessman

Monday, May 31, 1926
José Mendes Cabeçadas became both President and Prime Minister of Portugal.
The Polish Sejm elected Marshal Piłsudski President of the Republic, but he refused the position due to its limited powers.
The opening ceremonies for the Sesquicentennial Exposition were held in Philadelphia.
Frank Lockhart won the Indianapolis 500.
India, New Zealand and West Indies were elected as full members of the Imperial Cricket Conference, increasing the number of nations playing Test cricket from three to six.

References

1926
1926-05
1926-05